Cataclysta psathyrodes is a Crambidae species in the genus Cataclysta. It was described by Turner in 1908, and is known from Australia.

References

Moths described in 1908
Acentropinae